The 2012 Girls' Youth South American Volleyball Championship was the 18th edition of the tournament, organised by South America's governing volleyball body, the Confederación Sudamericana de Voleibol (CSV). It was determined February 26, 2011 the Peru would be the host. The top three teams qualified for the 2013 Youth World Championship.

Competing nations
The following national teams participated in the tournament, teams were seeded according to how they finished in the previous edition of the tournament with host Peru being seeded first:

First round
Venue: Coliseo Miguel Grau, Callao, Peru
All times are Peruvian Standard Time (UTC−05:00)

Pool A

Pool B

Final round

5th to 8th places bracket

Championship bracket

5th to 8th classification

Semifinals

7th place match

5th place match

3rd place match

Final

Final standing

Team Roster:
Luciana del Valle,
Hilary Palma,
Yomira Villacorta(L),
Cristina Cuba,
Shiamara Almeida,
Violeta Delgado(L),
Diana Torres,
Maguilaura Frias,
Barbara Briceño,
Rosa Valiente,
Andrea Urrutia,
Ángela Leyva(C),
Head Coach: Natalia Málaga

Individual awards

Most Valuable Player

Best Spiker

Best Blocker

Best Server

Best Digger

Best Setter

Best Receiver

Best Libero

References

External links
CSV official website

2012
S
Volleyball
V